The Spanish Princess is a historical drama television limited series developed by Emma Frost and Matthew Graham for Starz. Based on the novels The Constant Princess (2005) and The King's Curse (2014) by Philippa Gregory, it is a sequel to the miniseries The White Queen and The White Princess. It centres around Catherine of Aragon (Charlotte Hope), the eponymous Spanish princess who became Queen of England as the first wife of King Henry VIII (Ruairi O'Connor).

Designed as a 16-part limited series, the first eight episodes premiered on May 5, 2019. On June 3, 2019, Starz ordered the remaining eight episodes, which premiered on October 11, 2020. The series finale aired on November 29, 2020.

Premise
Teenaged princess Catherine of Aragon, daughter of Spanish rulers Isabella and Ferdinand, finally travels to England, to meet her husband by proxy, Arthur, Prince of Wales, heir apparent of Henry VII of England, to whom she has been betrothed since she was a child. Unwelcome by some, she and her diverse court, including her lady-in-waiting Lina, who is of Moorish ancestry, struggle to adapt to English customs. Catherine is horrified to learn that Arthur's younger brother, the arrogant Henry, Duke of York, is the author of the romantic correspondence she has received. When Arthur dies suddenly, her destiny as the one who will bring peace between Spain and England seems in doubt, until she sets her sights on Prince Henry.

Cast

Main

 Sai Bennett as Princess Mary of England, later Queen of France. Isla Merrick-Lawless portrays a younger Princess Mary.
 Alicia Borrachero as  Queen Isabella of Castille
 Andrew Buchan as Thomas More
 Laura Carmichael as Margaret "Maggie" Pole
 Daniel Cerqueira as De Fuensalida, the Spanish ambassador to England
 Aaron Cobham as Oviedo, a Spanish Muslim crossbow-maker and one of Princess Catherine of Aragon's guards
 Elliot Cowan as King Henry VII of England
 Philip Cumbus as Thomas Wolsey
 Antonio de la Torre as King Ferdinand II of Aragon
 Peter Egan as General Thomas Howard
 Alba Galocha as Queen Joanna of Castile
 Chloe Harris as Lady Elizabeth "Bessie" Blount
 Georgie Henley as Princess Margaret "Meg" Tudor, later Queen of Scotland 
 Charlotte Hope as Princess Catherine of Aragon, later Queen of England
 Angus Imrie as Crown Prince Arthur Tudor
 Stephanie Levi-John as Lina de Cardonnes, a Morisco lady-in-waiting to Catherine of Aragon
 Gordon Kennedy as John Stewart, Duke of Albany
 Alan McKenna as Sir Richard Pole
 Alexandra Moen as Elizabeth of York, Queen of England
 Ruairi O'Connor as Harry, Duke of York, later King Henry VIII of England
 Nadia Parkes as Rosa de Vargas, a lady-in-waiting to Catherine of Aragon
 Richard Pepper as Thomas Boleyn, Earl of Wiltshire
 Jordan Renzo as Charles "Charlie" Brandon
 Olly Rix as Edward Stafford
 Ray Stevenson as King James IV of Scotland
 Harriet Walter as Margaret Beaufort, the King's Mother

Recurring
 Mamadou Doumbia as John Blanke
 Morgan Jones as Edmund Dudley
 Nick Barber as Edmund de la Pole
 Mimi De Winton (part 1) and Amelia Gething (part 2) as Ursula Pole
 Arthur Bateman (part 1) and Clark Butler (part 2) as Reggie Pole
 Matt Carr (part 1) and Theo Ancient (part 2) as Henry Pole
 Luke Mullins as William Compton
 Moe Idris as Negasi
 Mark Rowley as Alexander Stewart
 Andrew Rothney as Angus Douglas
 Brian Ferguson as Gavin Douglas
 Jamie Michie as Hume
 Alice Nokes as Anne Boleyn
 Bessie Coates as Mary Boleyn
 Christopher Craig as King Louis XII of France
 Milo Callaghan as Henry Stafford
 Thoren Ferguson as Hal Stewart
 Billie Gadsdon as Princess Mary
 Lewis Russell as Jamie

Guests
 Kenneth Cranham as Bishop John Morton
 Patrick Gibson as Richard of York
 Luka Peroš as Christopher Columbus
 Norman Bowman as William Dunbar
 Philip Andrew as Philip I of Castile
 Philip McGinley as George Neville
 Sam John as Charles of Burgundy, later King Charles of Spain
 Ian Pirie as George Douglas
 Tessa Bonham Jones as Anne Hastings
 Molly Vevers as Jane Stewart
 Paul Forman as King Francis of France
 Jimmy Walker as John Lincoln
 Nathanael Jones as Henry Fitzroy

Episodes

Production

Development
On March 15, 2018, it was announced that Starz had greenlit the production. Emma Frost and Matthew Graham were set to serve as showrunners in addition to executive producing alongside Colin Callender, Scott Huff, Charlie Pattinson, and Charlie Hampton. Production companies All3 Media's New Pictures and Playground were expected to be involved.

On May 17, 2018, it was reported that the first two episodes would be directed by Birgitte Stærmose and that most episodes in the series would be directed by women.

On June 3, 2019, Starz announced that the series would return for another eight episodes and that Graham and Frost "always intended for The Spanish Princess to span 16 episodes, but they wrote a natural stopping place after the first eight just in case." Part two would be broadcast in 2020, with stars Charlotte Hope and Ruairi O'Connor returning to the show as Catherine and Henry, "along with other key cast." It was confirmed on June 9, 2019, by showrunner Emma Frost, that both Georgie Henley and Olly Rix, who portray Meg Tudor and Edward Stafford, would return for the next eight episodes and that Meg's role would be "huge in the back eight" and that "we are totally with her story, we're up in Scotland, we're sort of Spanish Princess meets Outlander" and that Stafford would get some "redemption." Richard Pepper's agent confirmed, on May 8, 2020, that he would return as Thomas Boleyn, Earl of Wiltshire. Jordan Renzo's return as Charles Brandon was confirmed by the part two teaser trailer on May 7, 2020 and Laura Carmichael's return was confirmed in an interview done by Emma Frost and Matthew Graham; the same interview confirmed that part two would "move around from France to England to Scotland a lot more and tell three interconnected stories."

Casting
Alongside the directing announcement, it was confirmed that Charlotte Hope, Stephanie Levi-John, Angus Imrie, Harriet Walter, Laura Carmichael, Ruairi O'Connor, Georgie Henley, Elliot Cowan, Alexandra Moen, Philip Cumbus, Nadia Parkes, Aaron Cobham, Alan McKenna, Richard Pepper, Olly Rix, Jordan Renzo, Daniel Cerqueira, and Alicia Borrachero had been cast in the series.

Filming
Principal photography for the series commenced on May 15, 2018, at Wells Cathedral in Wells, Somerset.

Principal photography for part two commenced on September 26, 2019 and finished on March 11, 2020, one day before lockdown due to COVID-19. Some filming took place at Mendip Hills, which doubled for Flodden Field.

Release
On December 20, 2018, a "first look" still image from the series was released. On January 25, 2019, a teaser trailer for the series was released.

On March 7, 2019, the series was given a May 5, 2019, premiere date. On September 10, 2020, the trailer for part two was released; the eight-episode installment premiered on October 11, 2020.

Reception

Critical response
The series received mixed to positive reviews in the United States. On the review aggregator website Rotten Tomatoes, part one of the series has an approval rating of 75% based on 12 reviews, with an average rating of 7.13/10. The website's critical consensus reads, "The Spanish Princess blends soapy melodrama with beautifully rendered historical set-pieces to paint a rounder — if still not fully realized — portrait of an often overlooked queen." Metacritic, which uses a weighted average, assigned a score of 73 out of 100 based on six critics, indicating "generally favorable reviews".

In Spain, the series caused curiosity upon release, but later received a combination of hard criticisms and tired indifference. It was accused of "wild historical inaccuracy", and has been described by various media as "insulting", "offensive", and "as full of stereotyping as sadly expected". The newspaper ABC wrote that it "invents and humiliates [Catherine's] history." The newspaper 20minutos and the TV guide by eldiario.es both call it "one of the worst shows about Spanish history."

Ratings

Home media release

References

External links
 
 

2019 American television series debuts
2019 British television series debuts
2020 American television series endings
2020 British television series endings
2010s American drama television series
2010s British drama television series
2020s American drama television series
2020s British drama television series
English-language television shows
Starz original programming
Television shows based on British novels
Fiction set in the 1500s
Television series about the history of England
Television series set in the 16th century
Cultural depictions of Catherine of Aragon
Cultural depictions of Isabella I of Castile
Cultural depictions of Margaret Pole, Countess of Salisbury